Naked is a 1986 album by the Art Ensemble of Chicago released on the Japanese DIW label. It features performances by Lester Bowie, Joseph Jarman, Roscoe Mitchell, Malachi Favors Maghostut and Don Moye.

Reception
Allmusic's Stephen Cook describes the album as "appealing without being especially challenging" and "a good introduction to the Art Ensemble of Chicago's vast catalog".

Track listing 
 "Dancer" (Moye) - 2:14  
 "Tobago Tango" (Bowie) - 7:13  
 "Flash 1" (Art Ensemble of Chicago) - 4:21  
 "We Bop" (Bowie)  6:07  
 "Charm No. 10" (Art Ensemble of Chicago) - 3:13  
 "RMR" (Jarman) - 8:04  
 "Galactic Landscape" (Art Ensemble of Chicago) - 8:11  
 "Way Way Down Yonder" (Favors) - 9:03  
 Recorded November 25 & 26, 1985 and July 25–27, 1986 in Brooklyn

Personnel 
 Lester Bowie: trumpet, fluegelhorn
 Malachi Favors Maghostut: bass, percussion instruments
 Joseph Jarman: saxophones, clarinets, percussion instruments
 Roscoe Mitchell: saxophones, clarinets, flute, percussion instruments 
 Don Moye: drums, percussion

References 

1986 albums
DIW Records albums
Art Ensemble of Chicago albums